Grosch medal (Grosch-medaljen) is a Norwegian architecture prize awarded bi-annually.

Foundation and purpose

The prize was established on the 200th anniversary of the birth of Christian Heinrich Grosch, and the first medal was awarded to Sverre Fehn in 2001. The ceremony took place in the Old University Hall, Oslo, a room designed by Grosch.

The organisation which awards the medal, Groschselskapet, was created in 2000. It works to create greater understanding of Grosch's work. The prize is to stimulate the quality of today's architecture.

Prize recipients 
2001 - Sverre Fehn
2003 - Jan Olav Jensen and Borre Skodvin (Jensen & Skodvin Architects) for Mortensrud church
2005 - Kjell Lund and Håkon Christie
2008 - Helge Hjertholm
2009 - Carl-Viggo Hølmebakk
2012 - Craig Dykers and Kjetil Trædal Thorsen, Snøhetta
2014 - Arne Henriksen
2018 - Einar Jarmund, Alessandra Kosberg and Håkon Vigsnæs

References

Architecture in Norway
Awards established in 2001
2001 in Norway
Architecture awards